{{DISPLAYTITLE:C9H8N2}}
The molecular formula C9H8N2 (molar mass: 144.17 g/mol, exact mass: 144.0687 u) may refer to:

 4-Aminoquinoline
 8-Aminoquinoline

Molecular formulas